Walhallow is a village in the North West Slopes region of New South Wales, Australia, near the Mooki River.

Walhallow is the site of a former Aboriginal reserve and was previously known as "Caroona" mission. It was first gazetted in 1895 following an application made a year previously to the Aboriginal Protection Board. The reserve was revoked in 1962 but the residents were permitted to remain under permissive occupancy until 1973 when the land was transferred to the Aboriginal Lands Trust under the Aboriginal Act (NSW) 1973.

The village consists of 42 houses of brick and tile construction. Since 1979, construction of these houses replaced timber and fibro houses built in the 1940s. Management of these houses is divided between two corporations; 23 houses by the Walhallow Local Aboriginal Land Council and the remainder by the Walhallow Aboriginal Corporation. The village also has a community hall, church and a primary health post (clinic). The former health post building is now used as the Community Development Employment Project (CDEP) offices. Walhallow Public School is one of only five schools in New South Wales with an all-Aboriginal enrolment.

After acquiring grant funds from the now abolished Aboriginal and Torres Strait Islander Commission, the village was fully equipped with housing, maintained roads and upgraded water and sewerage supplies by 1998. In 1997 Wallhallow was selected to be a finalist in the "small towns" category of the Tidy Towns awards.

There is another Walhallow at 17°47'0.27"S 135°39'43.53"E

References

External links
Working with Aboriginal and Torres Strait Islanders and their communities
Audio
A model town but wheres the pool

Towns in New South Wales
Aboriginal communities in New South Wales